The 1999 NCAA Division I baseball tournament was played at the end of the 1999 NCAA Division I baseball season to determine the national champion of college baseball. The tournament was expanded to 64 teams for 1999, adding a Super Regional. The tournament concluded with eight teams competing in the College World Series, a double-elimination tournament in its fifty third year.  Sixteen regional competitions were held to determine the participants in the final event, with each winner advancing to a best of three series against another regional champion for the right to play in the College World Series.  Each region was composed of four teams, resulting in 64 teams participating in the tournament at the conclusion of their regular season, and in some cases, after a conference tournament.  The fifty-third tournament's champion was Miami (FL), coached by Jim Morris. The Most Outstanding Player was Marshall McDougall of Florida State University.

National seeds
Bold indicates CWS participant.
Miami (FL)
Florida State
Cal State Fullerton
Baylor
Alabama
Stanford
Texas A&M
Rice

Regionals and super regionals

Bold indicates winner.

Coral Gables Super Regional

Tallahassee Super Regional

Columbus Super Regional

Waco Super Regional

Tuscaloosa Super Regional

Palo Alto Super Regional

College Station Super Regional

Houston Super Regional
Hosted by Rice at the Astrodome

College World Series

Participants

Results

Bracket

Game results

All-Tournament Team

The following players were members of the College World Series All-Tournament Team.

Notable players
 Alabama: Andy Phillips
 Cal State Fullerton: Adam Johnson, Kirk Saarloos
 Florida State: Kevin Cash, Matt Diaz
 Miami (FL): Bobby Hill, Mike Neu
 Oklahoma State: 
 Rice: 
 Stanford: Joe Borchard, Tony Cogan, Justin Wayne
 Texas A&M: Casey Fossum

References

NCAA Division I Baseball Championship
NCAA Division I Baseball Championship
Baseball in Houston
Baseball in Lubbock, Texas
Baseball in Waco, Texas
Events in Lubbock, Texas
Sports competitions in Texas